MLS Cup 2011, the 16th edition of Major League Soccer's championship match, was played between the Houston Dynamo and the Los Angeles Galaxy to decide the champion of the 2011 season. The soccer match was played at the Home Depot Center in Carson, California on November 20, 2011. Los Angeles won their third championship, defeating Houston 1–0 off a 72nd-minute goal from Galaxy captain Landon Donovan. David Beckham and Robbie Keane assisted the game's lone goal. With the win, the Galaxy became the first team since the Columbus Crew in 2008 to win both the Supporters' Shield and MLS Cup in the same year.

For Los Angeles, it was a league-record seventh appearance in the MLS Cup final, while it was Houston's third appearance in the league final. Both the Galaxy and the Dynamo qualified for the 2012–13 CONCACAF Champions League. The Galaxy earned their third successive berth, while the Dynamo earned their third ever berth in the Champions League and their first since the 2009–10 edition.

Road to the final

Los Angeles Galaxy

Ahead of the 2011 MLS Cup Playoffs, the Los Angeles Galaxy successfully defended the Supporters' Shield, winning it for the second consecutive year, and for the fourth time overall, tying D.C. United for the most regular season championships earned. The Galaxy became the third straight team to win back-to-back regular season titles.  The Galaxy earned the Shield on October 8, two weeks prior to the end of the regular season, and finished the season with a 19–5–10, posting the second total number of points (67) ever by a league premier.

As Shield winners, the Galaxy earned the benefit of playing the lowest seeded team to advance from the newly created wildcard round. In the Western Conference Semifinals, the Galaxy played the New York Red Bulls, who had the tenth best regular season record, which was the lowest seeded team in the playoffs. The first leg of the two-match, aggregate series began on October 30, 2011 with the opening leg being played at New York's Red Bull Arena. The opening leg ended with a critical away victory for Los Angeles, as the Galaxy earned a 1–0 victory off of a goal from Mike Magee. Following the match, controversy erupted after New York's Rafael Márquez threw the match ball at Los Angeles' Landon Donovan's ankles. Immediately, Márquez was confronted by Los Angeles' Adam Cristman and Juninho which caused some pushing and shoving, before several players on both sides attempted to break up the skirmish. Both Marquez and Juninho were subsequently red-carded, Márquez for throwing a ball at an opposing player, and Juninho for striking an opponent, who was New York's Stephen Keel.

On November 3, the second leg was played at the Galaxy's home ground, The Home Depot Center. With a capped seating capacity due to the match being played on a school night, only 20,000 seats were available. In the fourth minute, New York's Luke Rodgers tied the aggregate series at 1–1 and gave New York a 1–0 lead in the second leg. Magee once again scored against his former club in the 42nd minute, tying the match, and giving the Galaxy a 2–1 aggregate lead over the Red Bulls. In the 75th minute, Donovan scored off a penalty kick to give the Galaxy a 3–1 aggregate lead and 2–1 lead in the match, which ended in the final score of the match.

Upon victory, the Galaxy hosted the third-seeded Western Conference team, Real Salt Lake, in the 2011 MLS Western Conference Championship. The game, a rematch of the 2009 MLS Cup final, resulted in a 3–1 victory for the Galaxy.

The 2011 MLS Cup was the Galaxy's first MLS Cup Victory in regulation. The 2002 and the 2005 MLS Cup wins were won in overtime.

Houston Dynamo

The Houston Dynamo spent the first half of the regular season in inconsistent form, finding themselves in a slew of playoff bubble teams. In mid-September, the club hit solid form and finished their final six matches with four wins, no losses and two draws. After finishing second in the Eastern Conference, Houston received a direct bye to the Eastern Conference Semifinals. As the second-seeded club, Houston was paired up against the Philadelphia Union, who qualified for the playoffs for the first time in their history.

Against the Union, the Dynamo posted victories in each leg of the two-match, aggregate series, winning the round by a score of 3–1. The first match, played on October 29 at Philadelphia's PPL Park, marked Houston's first road playoff win. Houston defender and Canadian international André Hainault scored the opening goal in the fifth minute of play, only for Philadelphia's Sébastien Le Toux to tie the match two minutes later. In the 30th minute, Houston's Calen Carr scored the go-ahead goal, which ended up being the game-winning goal. Goalkeeper Tally Hall made 10 saves, six in the second half, to preserve the win.

The second leg of the conference semifinals was played at Robertson Stadium, Houston's final match at the stadium due to the opening of BBVA Compass Stadium in 2012. The game's lone goal came from longtime Houston striker Brian Ching, who scored three minutes into stoppage time in the first half of play on an assist by longtime teammate Brad Davis. It was Ching's sixth MLS Cup Playoffs goal, and his first playoff goal for the club since the 2007 MLS Cup Playoffs.

Since Sporting Kansas City, the top seed in the Eastern Conference, defeated the Colorado Rapids in their conference semifinal, the Dynamo traveled to Kansas City, Kansas to take on Sporting for the 2011 MLS Eastern Conference Championship. The two sides finished two points apart from one another during the regular season, as Sporting claimed the Eastern Conference regular season title after a 1–0 victory at D.C. United. The match was played at Sporting's Livestrong Sporting Park, the same location where Sporting defeated the Dynamo 3–0 in regular season play on September 10. The championship, however, played in Houston's favor, as the Dynamo posted a 2–0 victory at Kansas City.  Despite an injury to Davis, one of the finalists for the MLS MVP award, Hainault scored his second playoff goal in the 53rd minute, while Houston loanee and Honduran international Carlo Costly scored a buffer goal in the 87th minute to seal the club's third trip to the MLS Cup championship.

Pre-match

Venue selection

On the afternoon of May 10, 2011, Major League Soccer Commissioner Don Garber announced that the Home Depot Center in Carson, California would host the MLS Cup championship.  The final, which became the fourth league championship held at the stadium, gave it the record for the most MLS Cup finals held. The last time the Home Depot Center hosted the MLS Cup final was in 2008, when the Columbus Crew defeated Red Bull New York.

The Home Depot Center was the home ground of two Los Angeles-based clubs at the time, the Los Angeles Galaxy and C.D. Chivas USA.

Television

The match kicked off at 9:00 pm EST and was broadcast on ESPN for the third consecutive year, as well as Galavisión in the U.S. and on TSN2 in Canada. Additionally, it was aired during prime time for the third consecutive year.

Match details

Statistics

References

2011

Houston Dynamo FC matches
LA Galaxy matches
Sports competitions in Carson, California
November 2011 sports events in the United States
2011 in sports in California
21st century in Carson, California